Jean el Mouhouv Amrouche (7 February 1906 in Ighil Ali, Algeria – 16 April 1962 in Paris, France) was an Algerian francophone writer, poet and journalist.

Biography 
Jean el Mouhouv Amrouche was born February 7, 1906, in Ighil Ali, in the valley of Soumman, in petite Kabylie. Amrouche emigrated with his family to Tunisia while still young. Jean had his secondary education at Alaoui college and then left for the Ecole Normale Superieure de Saint-Cloud. He intends to become a teacher. The poet Armand Guibert made him known in Tunisia by publishing his two collections of poems, Cendres (poems 1928–1934) in 1934 and Étoile secrète in 1937. He wrote at that time (poems, literary criticism) in Tunisian journals and gave lectures at the Cercle de l'Essor in Tunis. For several years with his friend Armand Guibert, he visited many countries in Europe. In 1943, he joined the Ministry of Information in Algiers, then the Radiodiffusion Française.

He was the older brother of fellow writer Taos Amrouche. Both were the children of Fadhma Aït Mansour, author of History of My Life.

He died on 16 April 1962 at his home in Paris; he is buried in Sargé-sur-Braye in Loir-et-Cher.

Selected works 
 Chants Berbères de Kabylie, 1939
 Etoile Secrète, 1937
 Cendres : poèmes, 1928–1934, 1934

External links 
 Information in French

References 

1906 births
1962 deaths
People from Ighil Ali
Kabyle people
French-language poets
French people of Kabyle descent
Algerian male poets
20th-century Algerian poets
Berber poets
Berber writers
20th-century male writers
Migrants from French Algeria to France